The Dubrovnik Challenger was a professional tennis tournament played on outdoor clay courts in Dubrovnik. It was part of the ATP Challenger Tour.

Past finals

Singles

Doubles

References

ATP Challenger Tour
Clay court tennis tournaments
Tennis tournaments in Croatia